The Lamb is a 1915 American silent comedy/Western film featuring Douglas Fairbanks in his first starring role. Directed by W. Christy Cabanne, the film is based on the popular 1913 Broadway play The New Henrietta, in which Fairbanks co-starred with William H. Crane, Amelia Bingham and a very young Patricia Collinge.

A copy of The Lamb is preserved at the George Eastman House.

Cast
 Douglas Fairbanks – Gerald
 Seena Owen – Mary
 William E. Lowery – Yaqui Indian Chief 
 Lillian Langdon – Mary's Monther
 Monroe Salisbury – Mary's Cousin
 Kate Toncray – Gerald's Mother
 Alfred Paget – Bill Cactus
 Eagle Eye – Yaqui Indian Chief
 Tom Kennedy – White Hopeless (uncredited)
 Julia Faye – Woman (uncredited)
 Charles Stevens – Lieutenant (uncredited)
 Mary Thurman – extra role (uncredited)

Production
D. W. Griffith, writing under the pseudonym Granville Barker, along with director Christy Cabanne, essentially expanded the play beyond the plush nouveau riche apartment setting of the play, and provided a western element to the story. This would give Fairbanks a chance to show his physical prowess cinematically and loosen the play from what would be stage bound constraints. Griffith also altered characters; Fairbanks' character's name is changed to Gerald, with his parent being his mother (Kate Toncray), whereas in the play his character was named Nick with his parent being his father played by Crane.

Reception
Distributed by Triangle Film Corporation, the film premiered at the Knickerbocker Theater in New York City on September 23, 1915 along with the Keystone The Valet and The Iron Strain. The Lamb outperformed the other two features and was a hit with audiences and critics who praised Fairbanks' performance.

References

External links

 
 

1915 films
1910s adventure comedy films
1910s Western (genre) comedy films
American adventure comedy films
American black-and-white films
American films based on plays
Films directed by Christy Cabanne
Triangle Film Corporation films
1915 comedy films
Silent American Western (genre) comedy films
1910s American films
Silent adventure comedy films
1910s English-language films